Furo Iyenemi (born 17 July 1978) is a retired Nigerian international footballer who played as a defender for clubs in France, Belgium, Switzerland and Greece.

Club career
Born in Okrika, Iyenemi moved to France and began playing football for Paris Saint-Germain's reserve side in 1995. He signed a contract with Belgian Pro League club K.S.V. Waregem in 1997. He acquired Belgian citizenship and moved to Swiss Super League side FC Sion.

In January 2003, Iyenemi joined Greek Superleague side Akratitos F.C., where he would make 7 league appearances before leaving the club.

International career
Iyenemi played for Nigeria at the 2000 Summer Olympics in Sydney. He captained the team as they reached the last eight of the tournament.

Iyenemi played for the Nigeria national football team at the 2000 African Cup of Nations finals, making five appearances as Nigeria finished runners-up.

References

External links
 Furo Iyenemi official website
 
 
 
 
 
 
 
 

1978 births
Living people
People from Okrika
Sportspeople from Rivers State
Association football defenders
Nigerian footballers
Nigeria international footballers
Olympic footballers of Nigeria
Footballers at the 2000 Summer Olympics
2000 African Cup of Nations players
Royal Antwerp F.C. players
K.S.V. Waregem players
FC Sion players
Servette FC players
A.P.O. Akratitos Ano Liosia players
Challenger Pro League players
Super League Greece players
Expatriate footballers in France
Expatriate footballers in Belgium
Expatriate footballers in Switzerland
Expatriate footballers in Greece
Nigerian expatriate footballers